Dicranoloma is a genus of mosses in the family Dicranaceae. The Dicranoloma mosses are distributed in the Southern Hemisphere, while the Dicranum mosses are found in the Northern Hemisphere. Species within this genus are dioicous. Another genus in this family is Campylopus. Example occurrences of the genus Dicranoloma is in the form of mats on beech/podocarp forest floors of New Zealand's northern South Island. Dicranoloma dicarpum has a wide distribution in both hemispheres.

References
 C. Michael Hogan. 2009. Crown Fern: Blechnum discolor, Globaltwitcher.com, ed. N. Stromberg
 New York Botanical Garden. 1913. North American flora, Published by New York Botanical Garden, v. 15, pts. 1-2

Line notes

 
Moss genera